Mohsen Khazaei was an Iranian correspondent.

Biography
Mohsen Khazaei was born in December 6, 1972 in isfahan. Khazaei in 1995 began his activities as a sound operator in TV and Radio. In 2004, he became director of the Young Journalists' Club of Zahedan. When he gained success in the management of the Young Journalists' Club of Zahedan, he was  introduced as the news director of Gilan. He fathered three children.

Death in crossfire while reporting
In November 12, 2016, while he was embedded with Iranian-back militias besieging Eastern Aleppo for Islamic Republic of Iran Broadcasting and Fars News Agency, Khazaei was struck by shrapnel from a rebel mortar blast. As news of his death was broadcast, many people and officials expressed their sorrow in Iran.

See also
 Mahmoud Saremi
 Hassan Shemshadi

References

External links
 VIDEO : Funeral Held for Iranian Reporter Martyred in Syria
 VIDEO: Iranian TV Reporter Martyred by Terrorist Mortar Attack in Aleppo

1972 births
2016 deaths
People murdered in Syria
Iranian people murdered abroad
Iranian terrorism victims
Iranian murder victims
Journalists killed while covering the Syrian civil war